Guy II of Ponthieu (–25 December 1147) was the son of William III of Ponthieu and Helie of Burgundy.

Life 
He succeeded his father as Count of Ponthieu before 1129; this was during William's lifetime.  Around 1137, he founded the Cistercian Valloires Abbey.

He joined the Second Crusade under King Louis VII of France, and died of a disease on 25 December 1147 in Ephesus.

He was succeeded by his son John I of Ponthieu.

Marriage and issue 
His wife was called Ida; he had three children with her:
 John I (d. 1191), Count of Ponthieu
 Guido (d. between 1208 and 1218), Lord of Noyelles
 Agnes, abbess in Montreuil

Footnotes

References 

1147 deaths
Counts of Ponthieu
Year of birth uncertain
12th-century Normans
Christians of the Second Crusade